The 2023 European Championship B is an international rugby league tournament that is scheduled to take place in October and November 2023. It will be the eleventh staging of the second tier of the Rugby League European Championship, with the winners of both pools earning promotion to the 2027 Rugby League European Championship A and to the Europe Repêchage stage in 2025 Rugby League World Cup qualification.  Relegation for the tournament hasn't been confirmed as of February 2023.

Qualification
The tournament will consist of the Czech Republic, Germany, Greece, Netherlands, Norway and Ukraine.

Russia was originally part of the competition, but as they remained suspended due to the ongoing Russo-Ukrainian War. Czech Republic, who were the runners-up from 2021 Euro D Championship, replaced them in the tournament.

Group stage
Fixtures were announced on 28 October 2022.

Group A
Due to the ongoing conflict in Ukraine, both their group stage matches will be played away.

Group B

Final

See also 
 2023 Rugby League European Championship A

Notes

References 

European rugby league competitions
2023 in rugby league